Antirrhinum tortuosum is a species of plant in the family Plantaginaceae.

Sources

References 

tortuosum
Flora of Malta